Synodontis laessoei is a species of upside-down catfish endemic to Angola where it is only known from the Kokema River.  This species grows to a length of  TL.

References

External links 
}

laessoei
Freshwater fish of Africa
Fish of Angola
Endemic fauna of Angola
Taxa named by John Roxborough Norman
Fish described in 1923